Hallucinations is the debut album by the German death metal band Atrocity. It was released in 1990 by Roadrunner Records and was produced by Scott Burns. It is a concept album which follows the story of a young girl who is sexually abused as a child, and her descent into drug abuse, prostitution and eventual death.

The album was reissued in 1997 with the Blue Blood EP.

Track listing

Personnel

Atrocity
 Alexander Krull - vocals
 Mathias Röderer - guitar
 Richard Scharf - guitar
 Oliver Klasen - bass
 Michael Schwarz - drums

Production
 Scott Burns and Atrocity - production
 Markus Staiger - executive production
 Scott Burns and Tom Morris - engineering
 Scott Burns and Atrocity - mixing
 H.R. Giger - cover illustration: Work Nº 93, “Hommage an S. Beckett I”

References

1990 debut albums
Atrocity (band) albums
Albums produced by Scott Burns (record producer)
Albums with cover art by H. R. Giger
Concept albums